Jill Julius Matthews (born 1949) is an Australian social and feminist historian. She is emeritus professor in the College of Arts and Social Sciences at the Australian National University.

Matthews was born in Adelaide in 1949. She studied at Grange Primary School and then won a scholarship to Methodist Ladies College in Adelaide. She then went to the University of Adelaide where she began a law degree, changed to arts/law and graduated with a BA (hons) in 1970. While tutoring at Flinders University, Matthews began a PhD, supervised by Hugh Stretton, at the University of Adelaide. While completing her PhD she worked as part-time tutor and lecturer and a number of tertiary institutions in Adelaide.

She rewrote her PhD thesis, which was published as Good and Mad Women: The Historical Construction of Femininity in Twentieth Century Australia by Allen & Unwin. In her 1987 review, British historian Catherine Hall considered it to be an "essential starting point for British readers into the rapidly extending world of Australian feminist history".

Matthews was awarded a Nancy Keesing Fellowship by the State Library of New South Wales in 2004. Her 2005 book, Dance Hall and Picture Palace, won the prize for best monograph presented by the Film and History Association of Australia and New Zealand. It was also shortlisted for the Queensland Premier's Literary Award for History.

Her papers are held in the Australian National University Archives.

Selected works

References 

1949 births
Living people
University of Adelaide alumni
Academic staff of the Australian National University
Australian women historians